The Octave of Easter is the eight-day period, or octave, that begins on Easter Sunday and ends with the following Sunday. In Christian churches that celebrate it, it marks the beginning of Eastertide. The first seven of these eight days are also collectively known as Easter Week.

Days in the octave 

 Easter Sunday
 
 
 
 
 
 
 Second Sunday of Easter (also Divine Mercy Sunday in the Roman Catholic Church)

Liturgical celebration

Roman Rite Catholicism 

In the Ordinary Form of the Roman Rite of the Catholic Church, Easter is one of two solemnities with an octave, the other being Christmas. The days of the octave are given the second-highest rank in the calendar (second only to the Paschal Triduum and Easter itself), ranking even above normal solemnities. The paschal sequence Victimae paschali laudes may be sung before the Gospel reading on each of these days.

The Gospel readings for each of middle days within the octave are taken from the various Scriptural accounts of the Resurrection of Jesus.
 Monday: 
 Tuesday: 
 Wednesday: 
 Thursday: 
 Friday: 
 Saturday:

References 

Easter liturgy
Eastertide
Liturgical octaves